Ramez Ayoub  is a Canadian Liberal politician, who was elected to represent the riding of Thérèse-De Blainville in the House of Commons of Canada from the 2015 federal election until the 2019 Canadian federal election.

Ayoub attended the Université de Montréal, earning a bachelor's degree in economics.  He worked as a real estate broker, and entered politics by serving ten years on the city council of Lorraine, before being elected mayor of Lorraine in 2009, a position he held until his election to Parliament in 2015.  Ayoub also served, prior to his election to Parliament, as deputy prefect of Thérèse-De Blainville Regional County Municipality.  He was a recipient of the Queen Elizabeth II Diamond Jubilee Medal.

Electoral record

Federal

Municipal

References

Living people
Liberal Party of Canada MPs
Members of the House of Commons of Canada from Quebec
Université de Montréal alumni
Quebec municipal councillors
Mayors of places in Quebec
Canadian real estate businesspeople
21st-century Canadian politicians
1966 births
Canadian politicians of Syrian descent